Nowa Wieś  is a village in the administrative district of Gmina Nowogrodziec, within Bolesławiec County, Lower Silesian Voivodeship, in south-western Poland. 
 

References

Villages in Bolesławiec County